Karl Ludwig Friedrich Hetsch (or Louis Hetsch; 1808-1872) was a German songwriter. His modestly forgettable songs include Louange de la Havane.

External links

References

1808 births
1872 deaths
German songwriters
19th-century German musicians